The 1936 Ladies Open Championships was held at the Queen's Club, West Kensington in London from 2–7 March 1936. Margot Lumb won her second consecutive title defeating the Honourable Miss Anne Lytton-Milbanke in a repeat of the 1935 final. Eighty-six competitors entered resulting in the need for the Women's SRA to select fifty-six with the remaining twenty-nine taking part in eliminating events to find the final eight.

Draw and results

First round

Second round

Third round

Quarter-finals

Semi-finals

Final

References

Women's British Open Squash Championships
Women's British Open Squash Championships
Women's British Open Squash Championships
Women's British Open Squash Championships
Squash competitions in London
British Open Championships